Caulospongia is a genus of sea sponges belonging to the family Suberitidae.

Species 
The following species are recognised in the genus Caulospongia:
Caulospongia amplexa Fromont, 1998
Caulospongia biflabellata Fromont, 1998
Caulospongia elegans (Lendenfeld 1888)
Caulospongia pennatula (Lamarck 1814)
Caulospongia perfoliata (Lamarck 1814)
Caulospongia plicata Kent, 1871
Caulospongia reticulata Fromont, 1998
Caulospongia venosa Fromont, 1998

References 

Suberitidae
Sponge genera